Federico Barba (born 1 September 1993) is an Italian footballer who plays for  club Pisa as a central defender.

Biography

Youth career
Born in Rome, Italy, Barba was a six-year-old boy when began to play at the Axa Soccer School. Playing as a left or central defender, in 2007 he was sold to Cisco Roma (former Lodigiani), the third most popular soccer team in Rome, and at the age of 15 he was transferred to A.S. Roma where he played in the youth teams, coached, at first, by Andrea Stramaccioni and then by Alberto De Rossi. Barba won U17 national championship with Roma in 2010.; U20 "Primavera" reserve league in 2011 and Coppa Italia Primavera in 2012. In 2012, Federico Barba got the Italian award as the best young defender.

Grosseto
In July 2012 he was loaned to Serie B club Grosseto, partially due to the age restriction of Primavera had changed to U19 and partially by Barba had ready for professional league. Barba made his debut as starting defender in 2012–13 Coppa Italia. In 2012–13 Serie B, Barba made successive appearances since from 20 October 2012, becoming the regular central defender of Grosseto team. In June 2013, Grosseto acquired half of the registration rights of Barba for €200,000. However, Roma re-acquired Barba for €350,000 and re-sold him to Empoli.

Empoli
In August 2013, Barba was acquired by Empoli for €250,000 in another co-ownership deal. In June 2015 Empoli acquired the remain 50% registration rights from Roma for an undisclosed fee. He also has scored 2 goals for the club.

VfB Stuttgart
On 1 February 2016, Barba was loaned out to VfB Stuttgart until the end of the season with an option of purchase.

Sporting Gijón
In July 2017, Barba was acquired by Spanish club Sporting de Gijón for a reported €1 million fee.

ChievoVerona
On 14 August 2018, Barba signed with Serie A side ChievoVerona.

Valladolid (loan)
On 6 July 2019, he returned to Spain after agreeing to a one-year loan deal with La Liga side Real Valladolid.

Benevento
On 24 January 2020, Barba joined Serie B team Benevento on loan until 30 June 2020. Benevento held an obligation to purchase his rights at the end of the loan term. Barba signed a 3.5-year contract with Benevento with an additional one-year extension option.

Pisa
On 2 September 2022, Barba signed a three-season contract with Pisa.

International career
Barba made his debut in the third match of 2012 UEFA European Under-19 Football Championship qualification. In the elite qualification, he played twice as the holder of number 2 shirt. He played the first game after Rodrigo Ely was sent off, which Barba substituted forward Mattia Valoti. Due to Ely suspension, Barba played the second match but not the third match.

Barba received U20 call-up from Luigi Di Biagio in summer 2012. In November, he received call-up from Devis Mangia for Italy national under-21 football team against Spain national under-21 football team. However, he did not play that match.

References

External links
FIGC  

1993 births
Living people
Footballers from Rome
Italian footballers
Association football defenders
Serie A players
Serie B players
La Liga players
Segunda División players
A.S. Roma players
F.C. Grosseto S.S.D. players
Empoli F.C. players
A.C. ChievoVerona players
Bundesliga players
VfB Stuttgart players
Sporting de Gijón players
Real Valladolid players
Benevento Calcio players
Pisa S.C. players
Italy under-21 international footballers
Italian expatriate footballers
Italian expatriate sportspeople in Germany
Italian expatriate sportspeople in Spain
Expatriate footballers in Germany
Expatriate footballers in Spain